The Carnic and Gailtal Alps is a geographic grouping of mountain ranges belonging to the Southern Limestone Alps. They are located in Austria and Italy.

Geography 
The range is bound by the Drau River in the north, separating it from the Western Tauern section of the Central Eastern Alps. The northern, entirely Austrian range is called the Gailtal Alps or Drauzug, bordered by the Gail River in the south. The Gail Valley is on the Periadriatic Seam, so that from a tectonic perspective the Gailtal Alps belong to the Central Eastern Alps. The Gailtal Alps are divided by the very deep Gailbergsattel (981 m) into a higher western section called the Lienzer Dolomites and a lower eastern section, to which the name Gailtal Alps is sometimes restricted. Passes in the eastern section include the Kreuzbergsattel and Windische Höhe.

The main ridge of the Carnic Alps forms the Austrian-Italian border and stretches from prominent Mt. Helm near Sexten at the tripoint of East Tyrol, South Tyrol and Veneto to the Canal Valley at Tarvisio in the east.

In the south the Carnic Prealps stretch between the Piave and Tagliamento rivers down to the Padan Plain.

Administratively the range is divided between the Italian Region of Friuli-Venezia Giulia, and the Austrian states Tyrol and Carinthia.

SOIUSA classification 
According to SOIUSA (International Standardized Mountain Subdivision of the Alps) the Carnic and Gailtal Alps are an Alpine section, classified in the following way:
 main part = Eastern Alps
 major sector = Southern Limestone Alps
 section = Carnic and Gailtal Alps
 code = II/C-33

Subdivision 
The Carnic and Gailtal Alps are divided into three subsections:
 Carnic Alps (IT: Alpi Carniche; DE: Karnischer Hauptkamm) - SOIUSA code:II/C-33.I;
 Gailtal Alps (DE: Gailtaler Alpen or Drauzug) - SOIUSA code:II/C-33.II;
 Carnic Prealps (IT: Prealpi Carniche) - SOIUSA code:II/C-33.III.

Notable summits

Some notable summits of the range are:

References

Mountain ranges of the Alps
Landforms of Friuli-Venezia Giulia
Mountain ranges of Carinthia (state)
Mountain ranges of Tyrol (state)

es:Alpes de Carintia y de Eslovenia